Fredrik Oscar Vilhelm Nilsson (later Burnér; 10 April 1896 – 5 May 1974) was a Swedish horse rider. He competed in vaulting at the 1920 Summer Olympics and finished 17th, one place behind his compatriot Oskar Nilsson.

References

1896 births
1974 deaths
Olympic equestrians of Sweden
Swedish male equestrians
Equestrians at the 1920 Summer Olympics
20th-century Swedish people